The Irish Albums Chart ranks the best-performing albums in Ireland, as compiled by Chart-Track on behalf of the Irish Recorded Music Association. The chart week runs from Friday to Thursday.

See also
 List of number-one singles of 2013 (Ireland)

References

Number-one albums
Ireland
2013